is a village located in Aida District, Okayama Prefecture, Japan., the village had an estimated population of 1,361 in 593 households and a population density of 29 persons per km².

Geography
Nishiawakura is located in the northeastern part of Okayama Prefecture, bordering Hyōgo Prefecture and Tottori Prefecture. Located on the southern side of the Chugoku Mountains, mountains and forests occupy 95% of the village area; and the village is designated as a heavy snowfall area.

Neighboring  municipalities 
Okayama Prefecture
Mimasaka
Hyōgo Prefecture
 Shisō
Tottori Prefecture
Chizu
Wakasa

Climate
Nishiawakura has a Humid subtropical climate (Köppen Cfa) characterized by warm summers and cool winters with moderate snowfall.  The average annual temperature in Nishiawakura is 11.9 °C. The average annual rainfall is 1981 mm with September as the wettest month. The temperatures are highest on average in January, at around 23.8 °C, and lowest in January, at around 0.1 °C.

Demography
Per Japanese census data, the population of Nishiawakura has been as follows. The population has been steadily declining since the 1950s

History 
Nishiawakura is part of ancient Mimasaka Province. After the Meiji restoration, the area was organized  into Nishiawakura village, Yoshino District, Okayama Prefecture with  the creation of the modern municipalities system on June 1,1889. Yoshino District was merged into  Aida District, Okayama on April 1,1900.

Government
Nishiawakura has a mayor-council form of government with a directly elected mayor and a unicameral village council ten members. Nishiawakura, collectively with the city of Mimasaka, contributes one member to the Okayama Prefectural Assembly. In terms of national politics, the village is part of the Okayama 3rd district of the lower house of the Diet of Japan.

Economy
The main industry in the area is forestry and woodworking.

Education
Nishiawakura has one public elementary school and one public junior high school operated by the town government. The village does not have a high school.

Transportation

Railway 
 Chizu Express - Chizu Line
  -

Highways 
  Tottori Expressway

Notable people from Nishiawakura
Seiji Hagiwara, politician of the Liberal Democratic Party

References

External links

Nishiawakura official website 

Villages in Okayama Prefecture